Awais Ali (born 29 December 2005 in Gujranwala, Punjab) is a Pakistani cricketer who plays for Central Punjab. Ali made his List A debut for Central Punjab against Southern Punjab during the 2021-22 Pakistan Cup on 6 March 2022. Ali played for the Pakistan national under-19 cricket team during the 2022 ICC Under-19 Cricket World Cup. Ali was later included in the team of the tournament of the 2022 Under-19 World Cup.

References

External links 
 
 Awais Ali at Pakistan Cricket Board

2005 births
Living people
Pakistani cricketers
Central Punjab cricketers
People from Gujranwala